Hilara elegans is a species of fly in the family Empididae. It is found in Myanmar.

References

External links 

 
 Hilara elegans at insectoid.info

Insects described in 1952
Empididae
Arthropods of Myanmar